Nirali N. Shah is an American physician-scientist and pediatric hematologist-oncologist, serving as head of the hematologic malignancies section of the pediatric oncology branch at the National Cancer Institute. She researches the translation of immunotherapeutic approaches to treat high-risk hematologic malignancies in children, adolescents and young adults.

Early life and education 
Shah was raised in Chicago where her father is an internal medicine physician. She was interested in medicine at a young age. When Shah was 10, she fundraised for St. Jude Children’s Research Hospital and heard about pediatric oncology. As an undergraduate, she shadowed a pediatric hematologist-oncologist and developed an interest in understanding the complexity of how haematopoiesis is disrupted by leukemia. Shah completed a B.S. in secondary education in chemistry at University of Illinois at Chicago in 2000.

Shah received her M.D. in 2004 from the University of Illinois College of Medicine. Shah subsequently completed a dual residency program in internal medicine and pediatrics at the Harvard Combined Residency program and trained jointly at the Boston Children's Hospital and Massachusetts General Hospital, during which time she also served as Chief Resident. She then joined the Pediatric Hematology and Oncology Fellowship joint training program between the National Cancer Institute (NCI), Pediatric Oncology Branch (POB) and Johns Hopkins University and was an Associate Research Physician in the Pediatric Oncology Branch. In 2012, Shah earned a Masters of Health Science in Clinical Research through the joint NIH-Duke University School of Medicine. She completed the American Society for Blood and Marrow Transplantation Clinical Research Training Course (2012).

Career 
In 2019, Shah was appointed as an NIH Lasker Investigator. She is a member of multiple societies, including the American Society of Hematology, the American Society for Transplantation and Cellular Therapy, the Children’s Oncology Group, the Therapeutic Advances in Childhood Leukemia & Lymphoma consortium and the Pediatric Blood and Marrow Transplant Consortium. Shah is board certified in General Internal Medicine, General Pediatrics and Pediatric Hematology Oncology.

Research 
Shah is a physician-scientist who serves as the head of the hematologic malignancies section of the Pediatric Oncology Branch. Her primary research interests focus on translation of immunotherapeutic approaches to treat high-risk hematologic malignancies in children, adolescents and young adults. She has a particular interest in prevention and treatment of relapsed disease after allogeneic hematopoietic stem cell transplantation. Her clinical trials focus on exploring and optimizing chimeric antigen receptor T cell (CAR-T cell) based strategies and other antibody based therapies to target surface proteins found on leukemia cells to improve outcomes for chemotherapy refractory disease. Additional areas of expertise include pediatric hematopoietic stem cell transplantation in both malignant and non-malignant diseases, development of early phase clinical trials in pediatric oncology, and ethical considerations for inclusion of minors in research. Shah also serves as the NCI Fellowship Program director for the joint Johns Hopkins Hospital-National Cancer Institute Pediatric Hematology-Oncology Fellowship Program.

Her clinical work has included implementation of conduct of several Phase I trials for the treatment of relapsed/refractory pediatric acute lymphoblastic leukemia. Prior trials have included a pediatric phase I trial of vincristine sulfate liposomal injections (Marqibo®), a pediatric phase I trial of moxetumomab pasudotox, (an anti-CD22 targeted immunotoxin based therapy), and a pilot trial using WT1 dendritic cell vaccines for the treatment of post-transplant relapsed leukemia. Results from the trials have included establishment of a safety profile, identification of a dose and an understanding of pharmacokinetics leading to development of Phase 2 multicenter studies that she will be leading. More recently she has led the effort in CAR-T cell therapy targeting CD22 for the treatment of relapsed/refractory ALL and will be leading a trial using a combinatorial CD19/CD22 targeted CAR-T cell approach. In addition to her work in leukemia, she also serves to support pediatric transplantation at the NCI by serving as an associate investigator on several transplant trials focused on patients with primary immunodeficiency and is leading the effort on transplantation for children with DOCK8 deficiency in collaboration with investigators in NIAID.

Personal life 
Shah speaks English and Gujarati.

Selected works

References 

Living people
20th-century births
Year of birth missing (living people)
Place of birth missing (living people)
Scientists from Chicago
Physicians from Illinois
American medical researchers
Cancer researchers
Women medical researchers
21st-century American women scientists
21st-century American women physicians
21st-century American physicians
American oncologists
American hematologists
Women oncologists
Women hematologists
American people of Gujarati descent
American women of Indian descent in health professions
Duke University School of Medicine alumni
University of Illinois College of Medicine alumni
National Institutes of Health people
American physicians of Indian descent